On November 22, 1831, a special election was held in  to fill a vacancy caused by the death of William Ramsey (D) on September 29, 1831.

Election results

McCoy took his seat December 5, 1831, at the start of the 1st session of the 22nd Congress

See also
List of special elections to the United States House of Representatives

References

Pennsylvania 1831 11
Pennsylvania 1831 11
1831 11
Pennsylvania 11
United States House of Representatives 11
United States House of Representatives 1831 11
November 1831 events